Yours Truly is the 12th studio album from jazz trumpeter Rick Braun.  It was released in 2005 on ARTizen Music, the label he co-founded with Richard Elliot (with whom Braun would also collaborate the following year).

The nine-track disc contains no original material.  Instead, Braun has chosen to cover hit pop songs by bands as diverse as Sade, Simply Red and Earth, Wind & Fire.  He also covers songs by John Mayer, Lisa Stansfield & Lou Reed.

Allmusic's Paula Edelstein gave the release a rating of four stars (of a possible five), stating, "this is classic Rick Braun in a mellow, melodic mood, transporting listeners with the rich tones of his muted trumpet voice through the musical landscape of his life."

Track listing
"Shining Star" (originally by Earth, Wind & Fire; written by Phillip Bailey, Lorenzo Dunn & Maurice White) 3:30
"Holding Back the Years" (originally by Simply Red; written by Mick Hucknall & Neil Moss) 4:41
"Love's Theme" (originally by Barry White; written by White) 4:36
"All Around The World" (originally by Lisa Stansfield; written by Stansfield, Ian Devaney & Andrew Morris) 4:59
"Walk on the Wild Side" (originally by Lou Reed; written by Reed) 4:05
"Daughters" (originally by John Mayer; written by Mayer) 5:10
"Groove is in the Heart (originally by Deee-Lite; written by Dmitry Brill, Herbie Hancock & Kamaal Fareed) 4:37
"Kiss of Life" (originally by Sade; written by Sade Adu, Paul S. Denman & Andrew Hale) 4:48
"What Are You Doing the Rest of Your Life?" (originally by Michael Dees for the movie The Happy Ending; written by Alan Bergman, Marilyn Bergman & Michel Legrand) 4:53

References

2005 albums
Rick Braun albums